Broadstairs is a coastal town on the Isle of Thanet in the Thanet district of east Kent, England, about  east of London. It is part of the civil parish of Broadstairs and St Peter's, which includes St Peter's, and had a population in 2011 of about 25,000. Situated between Margate and Ramsgate, Broadstairs is one of Thanet's seaside resorts, known as the "jewel in Thanet's crown". The town's coat of arms' Latin motto is Stella Maris ("Star of the Sea"). The name derives from a former flight of steps in the chalk cliff, which led from the sands up to the 11th-century shrine of St Mary on the cliff's summit.

The town spreads from Haine Road in the west to Kingsgate (named after the landing of King Charles II in 1683), a hamlet in St Peter parish in the north, and to Dumpton in the south (named after the yeoman Dudeman who farmed there in the 13th century). The hamlet of Reading (formerly Reden or Redyng) Street was established by Flemish refugees in the 17th century.

History
The inland village of St Peter's was established after the building of a parish church in about 1080.
The coastal confederation of Cinque Ports during its mediæval period consisted of a confederation of 42 towns and villages in all. This included St Peter's, as a 'limb' of Dover.
On the nearby coast was a cliff-top shrine, the Shrine of Our Lady, at what was then called Bradstow(e), meaning "broad place" (perhaps referring to the wide bay).

A fishing settlement developed in the vicinity of the shrine in the 14th century. This came to be called "Broadstairs", after a flight of steps which was made in the cliff to give access to the shrine from the bay. Charles Culmer, son of Waldemar, is supposed to have reconstructed the stairs in 1350.

1400–1700
In 1440, an archway was built by George Culmer across a track leading down to the sea, where the first wooden pier or jetty was built in 1460. A more enduring structure was to replace this in 1538, when the road leading to the seafront, known as Harbour Street, was cut into the rough chalk ground on which Broadstairs is built, by another George Culmer. Going further in defence of the town, he built the York Gate in 1540, a portal that still spans Harbour Street and which then held two heavy wooden doors that could be closed in times of threat from the sea. Richard Culmer was the son of Sir Richard Culmer by his first wife and was born in 1640/41.

Richard was buried in the parish church of Monkton, on the Isle of Thanet. Of his legacies was the endowment on Broadstairs of an area of six acres (24,000 m2) of ground for the poor of the parish. The name survives to this day as "Culmer's Allotment" as does the allotment.

1700–1815
In 1823, Broadstairs had a population of about 300. A brief outline of the history of Broadstairs Pier is given in Broadstairs, past and present, which mentions a storm in 1767, during which Culmer's work was all but destroyed. At this time, it was of considerable importance to the fishing trade with catches as far afield as Great Yarmouth, Hastings, Folkestone, Dover and Torbay and elsewhere being landed. It had become so indispensable that the corporations of Yarmouth, Dover, Hythe and Canterbury with assistance from the East India Company and Trinity House subscribed to its restoration with a payment of £2,000 in 1774.

By 1795, York Gate needed repair to repel any threat from the French Revolutionary Wars. The subsequent renovation was undertaken by Lord Hanniker in the same year as the first lightvessel was placed on the Goodwin Sands.

On the occasion of the landing at Thanet of Major Henry Percy of the 14th Dragoon Guards, on 21 June 1815 with the captured French eagle standard taken at Waterloo, a tunnel stairway from the beach to the fields on the cliff tops above was excavated, and christened "Waterloo Stairs" to commemorate the event. Broadstairs was supposedly the first town in England to learn of this historic victory, although there is no written evidence of this.

Smuggling was an important industry in the area, and the men of Broadstairs and St Peter's became very good at outwitting customs agents. This was very profitable because of the very high duty payable on tea, spirits and tobacco. There is a network of tunnels and caves strewn in the chalk strata which were used by smugglers to hide their contraband.

Development as a seaside resort

By 1824 steamboats were becoming more common, having begun to make over from the hoys and sailing packets about 1814. These made trade with London much faster. The familiar sailing hoys took anything up to 72 hours to reach Margate from London, whereas the new steamships were capable of making at least nine voyages in this time. Mixed feelings must have been strongly expressed by the Thanet boatmen in general, as the unrivalled speed of the steam packet was outmanoeuvring all other classes of vessel, but it brought a new prosperity to Thanet.

The young Princess Victoria and her mother, the Duchess of Kent, were summer visitors 1826–1836, staying at Pierremont Hall (in present-day Pierremont Park). The house was built in 1785 by Samuel Pepys Cockerell for Thomas Douglas Forsyth, and later used as a school and an events venue.

In the middle of the 19th century, the professional classes began to move in. By 1850, the population had reached about 3,000, doubling over the previous 50 years. Due to the fresh sea air, many convalescent homes for children opened towards the end of the 19th century.

Although numerous holidaymakers were attracted to Broadstairs and to other Thanet seaside towns during the Victorian era, it was not directly served by the railways until 1863. This was a time of great expansion for railways in the South East; in 1860 Victoria Station had been completed, followed by Charing Cross and Cannon Street. Rail access to Broadstairs had previously relied heavily upon coach links to other railway stations in the district or region; with firms such as Bradstowe Coachmasters, operated by William Sackett and John Derby, principally involved. Their coaches connected Broadstairs to Whitstable station where a railway service had begun as early as 1830 (one of the first in England, with its pioneering Stephenson's engine Invicta).

In 1841, 44 mariners were recorded as resident in Broadstairs; nine of these being specified as fishermen, and of course the residual boat-building activity that remained after the Culmer White yard closed in 1824 (under pressure from the steamships), still continued (though there were only four shipwrights recorded in the census: Solomon Holbourn and Joseph Jarman among them). Others may have been at sea on census day: Steamer Point, as the pier head at Broadstairs was then known, would have been fairly busy with shipping movements since consignments of coal and other produce would have been traded along the coast and there would have been regular work on the steam packet to and from Ramsgate. By the 1840s, the smuggling had ceased.

By 1910, the population had reached about 10,000. A "guide book" of the 1930s by A.H. Simison (the photographic chemist) entitled Ramsgate (The Kent Coast at its best) Pictorially Presented, describes Broadstairs town as having approached modernisation and urban development "always with a consistent policy of retaining those characteristics for which it has for so long been renowned". The town has retained many aspects of historical interest, besides its maritime history. Amongst these is its notable religious history, evoked by places such as the Shrine of Our Lady, Bradstowe.

Governance
Broadstairs is within the Thanet local government district. The town contains the five electoral wards of Bradstowe, St Peter's, Beacon Road, Viking and Kingsgate. These wards have eleven of the fifty six seats on the Thanet District Council. At the 2007 local elections, all eleven of those seats were held by the Conservative Party. Broadstairs and St Peter's Town Council has 15 members, who are elected every four years, led by the mayor.

The Member of Parliament (MP) for South Thanet is Craig Mackinlay of the Conservative Party. He has been the constituency's MP since the 2015 general election.

Broadstairs and St Peter's have been twinned with Wattignies in northern France since the early 1980s.

Geography

The town lies above a harbour with cliffs on either side. It has seven bays of golden sand, which are (from south to north) Dumpton Gap, Louisa Bay, Viking Bay, Stone Bay, Joss Bay, Kingsgate Bay and Botany Bay.  North Foreland rises between Stone Bay and Joss Bay.

On the cliffs above Kingsgate Bay is Kingsgate Castle, formerly part of the estate of Lord Holland but now converted into private residences.

Broadstairs has a very mild maritime climate.

Demography

At the 2001 UK census, the parish of Broadstairs and St Peter's had 24,370 residents in 10,597 households. Of those households, 34.2% were married couples, 6.7% were cohabiting couples and 8.3% were lone parents. 31.8% of all households were made up of individuals, and 20.9% had someone living alone at pensionable age. 25.7% of households included children aged under 16, or a person aged 16 to 18 who was in full-time education.

The parish has a low proportion of non-white people compared with national figures; the ethnicity recorded in the 2001 census was 97.9% white, 0.7% mixed race, 0.3% Chinese, 0.7% other Asian, 0.2% black and 0.2% other. The number of foreign-born residents is relatively low; the place of birth of residents in 2001 was 94.7% United Kingdom, 0.7% Republic of Ireland, 0.5% Germany, 0.9% other Western Europe countries, 0.3% Eastern Europe, 0.8% Africa, 0.6% South Asia, 0.5% Far East, 0.3% North America, 0.2% Middle East, 0.2% Oceania and 0.1% South America. Religion was recorded as 75.3% Christian, 0.4% Muslim, 0.3% Hindu, 0.3% Buddhist and 0.3% Jewish. 14.3% were recorded as having no religion, 0.5% had an alternative religion and 8.6% did not state their religion.

The age distribution was 5% aged 0–4 years, 14% aged 5–15 years, 5% aged 16–19 years, 26% aged 20–44 years, 27% aged 45–64 years and 24% aged 65 years and over. There was a high percentage of residents over 65, compared with the national average of 16%, mainly due to seaside towns being popular retirement destinations. For every 100 females, there were 87.1 males.

Employment
At the 2001 census, the economic activity of residents aged 16–74 was 34.1% in full-time employment, 12.8% in part-time employment, 10.0% self-employed, 2.9% unemployed, 2.3% students with jobs, 4.1% students without jobs, 20.0% retired, 6.5% looking after home or family, 4.9% permanently sick or disabled and 2.4% economically inactive for other reasons. The percentage of retired people was significantly higher than the national figure of 14%. The percentage of unemployed people was low compared with the national rate of 3.4% and the district rate of 4.4%. Only 12% of residents aged 16–74 had a higher education qualification or the equivalent, compared with 20% nationwide. The Office for National Statistics estimated that during the period of April 2001 to March 2002, the average gross weekly income of households was £522 (£27,219 per year).

The industry of employment of residents, at the 2001 census, was 15% retail, 14% health and social work, 13% manufacturing, 13% education, 10% real estate, 8% construction, 7% transport and communications, 6% public administration, 5% hotels and restaurants, 3% finance, 1% agriculture and 5% other community, social or personal services. Compared with national figures, there was a relatively high number of workers in the education and health/social care industries and a relatively low number in finance and real estate. Many residents commute to work outside the town; at the 2001 census, the town had 9,842 employed residents, but there were only 9,049 jobs within the town.

Economy
As a seaside resort, the economy is mainly based around tourism; there are hotels and guest houses on and near the seafront to accommodate the influx of all-year-round visitors. Although the number of hotels in recent years has declined because of the high land redevelopment values, this has resulted in an improvement in quality of the existing premises. The High Street has a wide variety of independent shops and services and there are several factories, mainly situated on the small industrial estates on the town's borders. The above-average population age has led to many health- and social-care jobs at local care homes. At the 2001 UK census, 1.8% of the population resided in a medical or care establishment, which is more than double the national average of only 0.8%. Many jobs in education are provided by the town's relatively high number of schools and colleges.

Broadstairs' & St Peter's Chamber of Commerce has existed for over 100 years and has been instrumental in establishing links between traders and authority and raising money for projects including the town's CCTV scheme. It organises events and promotes tourism to benefit the town economy, the local customer and visitors.
The largest of Broadstairs' industrial estates is at Pyson's Road.
Residential building land is now scarce and property prices within Broadstairs tend to be higher than the rest of Thanet.
Broadstairs has seen major development in its area recently with a large out-of-town shopping development at Westwood called Westwood Cross. This has attracted national retailers, a new Travelodge hotel a bingo club, a casino, a vue cinema, a new fitness centres, and an Ask, Nando's, Frankie & Benny's restaurants.
Land is currently being redeveloped to extend the existing Westwood Cross shopping centre.
Within the Broadstairs boundary there are three large supermarkets: Asda, Sainsbury's and a Tesco Extra, which, before redevelopment, was the home of a large Co-op store (one of the first hypermarkets built in the UK). Tesco has a metro store in the town. Tesco also has a convenience store (Tesco Express) in the town and there is a small Co-op in St Peter's village.
Motor and household insurance claims of Saga Insurance Ltd. are managed in Broadstairs (as an extension of their main offices in Folkestone).

Culture and community 
There is a small cinema, "The Palace Cinema" (formerly known as The Windsor), in Harbour Street.
The Broadstairs Dickens Festival is held annually in honour of the novelist Charles Dickens on or around the third week of June. The festival includes a production of one of Dickens' novels, with people about the town wearing Victorian dress. The festival first took place in 1937, when the then owner of Dickens House conceived the idea of commemorating the centenary of the author's first visit by putting on a production of David Copperfield, a novel written in the town.

In the second week of August each year, the town holds Broadstairs Folk Week music festival. The main acts perform at the Concert Marquee in the town's main park (Pierremont Park), with smaller musical events held in public houses, restaurants, cafés, and at the town's bandstand. Itinerant musicians and Morris dancers perform along the bay promenade. A school and playing field becomes an organization centre and campsite for entertainers. The town's population significantly increases with tourists, day-trippers and holiday makers.
During the summer season, and on 5 November, there are firework displays every Wednesday evening on Viking Bay.
 In August the town holds an annual Water Gala. In the past this has included a visit by the Red Arrows, a hovercraft and lifeboats. Beach-based competitions and shows continue through the day. A funfair is on the cliff-top gardens, and a small air display takes place.
 In the village of St Peter's, tours are held throughout the summer.
More recently, a new event has been added to the mix – the Big Broadstairs Weekend. Starting the season in May, the event is themed, comprises a dance at the Pavilion on the Friday night, Film on the Beach on the Saturday night and a Guinness World Record Attempt on the Sunday. Broadstairs currently holds the record for biggest remote dance class.

Landmarks 

The beaches at Botany Bay and Joss Bay were awarded the Blue flag rural beach award in 2005. Viking Bay beach, the main beach in Broadstairs, won the Blue Flag in 2006. In summer, this bay is often very busy with tourists enjoying cafes and ice-cream outlets. On Harbour Street, the Pavilion on the Sands hosts a summer show and all-year entertainment, with extensive views across the bay. Its location and facilities make the Pavilion a popular wedding venue.

The Dickens House Museum on the seafront, displays many artefacts relating to Charles Dickens and his life in Broadstairs. Crampton Tower by the railway station houses a museum containing Thomas Russell Crampton's working drawings, models, graphics, patents, awards and artefacts connected to his life and works. Other galleries illustrate the history and development of the railways, the electric tramways, road transport and other aspects of local industry. The original Broadstairs stagecoach, built in 1860, is displayed alongside seven working model railways in gauges N, OO, O and Gauge One.

Transport 

In 1851, the region's rail network was supplemented by the London to south coast route, including the coastal link from Chichester to Ramsgate, the cross-country service between London and Dover and the Mid-Kent line that linked Redhill, Tonbridge and Ashford to London's first Eurostar terminal at Waterloo (opened in 1848). Broadstairs station (unlike neighbouring Margate) is a 10-minute walk from the beach. Although rebuilt in the 1920s, electricity was not installed at the station until well into the 1970s, and the buildings and platforms remained illuminated by gaslight until then.

Since 2009 Southeastern have been operating a high speed train service between London St Pancras and Ashford International which runs on to Broadstairs cutting about 40 minutes from what was once a two-hour journey to other termini in London. It is unusual in that trains to London can run either way through the station.

Lifeboats
Lifeboats arrived in Broadstairs in 1851. News of the loss of the Irish packet  with 250 lives, on the sands off Margate on 6 April 1850, may have been the prompt that led old Thomas White to present one of his lifeboats to his home town of Broadstairs that summer. The lifeboat saw its first use on 6 March 1851, when the brig Mary White became trapped on the Goodwin Sands during a severe gale blowing from the north. A ballad was written to celebrate the occasion, "Song of the Mary White".

Solomon Holbourn of Broadstairs, coxswain of the Mary White, had an aunt, Sophia, who married William Stevenson at Folkestone in 1813. Their eldest son, also William, became a mariner and boatman and in 1839 married Elizabeth Wellard at St Peter's, Broadstairs. In 1848 they had a son, again named William, who in adult life was better known as Bill "Floaty" Stevenson, and became a member of the Frances Forbes Barton lifeboat crew. The "Frances Forbes Barton" was originally, in 1897, the legacy of a Miss Webster to the boatmen of Broadstairs. It is recorded as having remained at that station until 1912, when it was moved to the Walmer station when the Broadstairs station closed. In its time at Broadstairs it had been launched 77 times and saved 115 lives, by far the most effective of the RNLI craft stationed there.

Broadstairs' lifeboats were further supported by a fund established in the 1860s by Sir Charles Reed FSA.

Education

State schools
Infant and Primary
St Mildred's Infant School
Upton Junior School
St Peter in Thanet CE Junior School
St Joseph's RC Primary School
Bromstone County Primary School

Secondary Modern and Grammar
Dane Court Grammar School
St Georges C of E Foundation School
The Charles Dickens School
Chatham House Grammar School
Clarendon House Grammar School

Special schools
Bradstow School
Stone Bay School

Independent schools
Junior and Preparatory
St Lawrence College, Junior School
Haddon Dene School
Wellesley House School
St Peter's Court (now demolished; merged with Wellesley House School in 1969)

Senior schools
St Lawrence College

Colleges and universities
East Kent College
Canterbury Christ Church University

Religious sites 
The original Shrine of Our Ladye Star of the Sea is believed to date back to at least the 11th century. The chapel on what is now Albion St was destroyed by a storm in the 16th century but was restored in 1601. It gives its name to the Roman Catholic Church of Our Lady Star of the Sea in Broadstairs.

The Anglican parish church is Holy Trinity, dating from 1830, and which was described by Dickens as "a hideous temple of flint, like a petrified haystack". The church of St. Peter-in-Thanet has one of the longest churchyards in England.

Sport 

Thanet Wanderers Rugby Union Football Club is based in Broadstairs at  St. Peter's Recreation Ground.
Sandcastle building competition takes place annually.
Broadstairs has a Green bowling club.
Broadstairs & St Peter's Lawn Tennis Club
Beach Volley Ball is held on the beach in the summer.
Broadstairs is home to the North Foreland Golf Club.
Broadstairs Sailing Club in Harbour Street once had former prime minister Edward Heath as a member.
Fishing competitions are regularly held in the Harbour.

Sea Swimming 
Sea swimming is popular, especially on the beach at Viking Bay, which is patrolled by lifeguards during the summer. Dickens swam here and British comedian Frank Muir grew up as a 'Beach Boy' in the town, describing his experience in the sea and on 'the sands' in a chapter of his autobiography.

There are public toilets at the beach level in Viking Bay, but no changing facilities and one very basic freshwater shower (summer only). There is a freshwater tap at the bottom of the steps at the north end of the bay. 

The bay is marked by striped posts on rocks at either end. The bay is alternately full of water at high tide or completely dry at low tide.  At high tide, the beach shelf drops off quickly and a swimmer can be out of their depth within a few feet of the shore. At middle and low tides, the shelf is much more gently sloping and it is possible to play in the surf, and even swim, in water that is only waist high. At high tide and middle tide, swimmers that stay within the bay (within the posts) are completely sheltered from the tidal stream of the English Channel. At any tide, swimmers venturing out beyond the striped posts may encounter a strong tidal current running parallel to the coast, flowing either from south to north or north to south, depending on whether the tide is coming up the English Channel or draining out through it. Even strong experienced swimmers will find it difficult to make progress against this tidal stream at its greatest flow, and swimmers in difficulty should swim directly towards the nearest part of the shore, rather than try to return to the point where they originally entered.

Stone Bay to the north of Viking Bay also has a lifeguard in summer and attracts swimmers at all times of the year.

Media 
Broadstairs has only one paid-for newspaper, the Isle of Thanet Gazette. Its sister publication, the Thanet Times, closed in October 2012 after 116 years; both were owned by Northcliffe Media. Isle magazine is published quarterly and includes listings of events as well as accommodation and tourist information. A digital edition is available online. The Broadstairs Beacon magazine has been published three times a year since 2019 and is available online or in printed form for free at several places in the town.

Local radio stations are KMFM Thanet, owned by the KM Group, community radio station Academy FM (Thanet); and the county-wide stations Heart Kent, Gold and BBC Radio Kent. Thanet Community Radio also offer an online community podcasting service for Ramsgate, Broadstairs, Margate and the wider areas of Thanet.

Notable people 

People from Broadstairs are called Bradstonians.

William Bridges Adams, locomotive engineer and inventor of the Adams Axle, died at Broadstairs in 1872 and was buried at St Peter's Church.
Sir Richard Rodney Bennett, composer and pianist, was born in Broadstairs in 1936.
John Buchan apparently based the title of his novel, The Thirty Nine Steps after the set of steps on the beach at a house called St Cuby, Cliff Promenade at North Foreland, Broadstairs, where he was recuperating from illness in 1915.
Thomas Russell Crampton, MICE, MIMechE, railway engineer, was born in Broadstairs in 1816.
Charles Dickens visited Broadstairs regularly from 1837 until 1859 and described the town as "Our English Watering Place". He wrote David Copperfield while staying at Bleak House.
Tim Edey, multi-instrumentalist and composer, grew up in Broadstairs.
Sir Edward Heath, Prime Minister of the United Kingdom from 1970 to 1974, was born in Broadstairs in 1916 and lived there until going to study at Balliol College, Oxford in 1935.
Edward Higgins (E. O. Higgins), fiction writer, podcaster and performer lived in Broadstairs for two years from 2009, whose novel Conversations with Spirits is based in the town
Oliver Postgate, writer of the Clangers animated TV series, was a longtime resident of Broadstairs and his life is commemorated by a mosaic of the Clangers and a blue plaque on the front of his home in Chandos Square.
Writer and filmmaker Bruce Robinson set his first full-length novel The Peculiar Memories of Thomas Penman in the Broadstairs. Robinson is from the town and the novel is semi-autobiographical.  
 Tallulah, DJ who studied catering at East Kent College.

See also 
 Bleak House – the Dickens novel is set in St Albans.
Thanet power station

References

External links 

Broadstairs Cliff Railway (1901–1991)
Broadstairs and St. Peter's Town Council

 
Seaside resorts in England
Towns in Kent
Populated coastal places in Kent
Beaches of Kent